Halligeri is a village in Dharwad district of Karnataka, India.

Demographics 
As of the 2011 Census of India there were 325 households in Halligeri and a total population of 1,784 consisting of 885 males and 899 females. There were 312 children ages 0–6.

References

 Government website on Belgaum district
 Directorate of Industries & Commerce
 Ultimate Guide for Belgaum City
 Belgaum Fort of Rattas on Google Maps
 AllABoutBelgaum.com The only daily updated news portal for Belgaum

Villages in Dharwad district